Harris' Missouri Battery may refer to:

 Harris' Missouri Battery (1862), a unit of the Confederate States Army active in 1862
 Harris' Missouri Battery (1864), a unit of the Confederate States Army active in 18641865